Theodore James Schulz (born October 29, 1959) is an American professional golfer who has played on the PGA Tour, Nationwide Tour and Champions Tour.

Schulz was born, raised and has lived his entire life in Louisville, Kentucky. He attended the University of Louisville from 1977 to 1981, and was a member of the golf team. He joined the PGA Tour in 1984.

Schulz has 15 top-10 finishes in PGA Tour events including two wins. His career year was 1991 when he had five top-10 finishes including a win at the Nissan Los Angeles Open, and finished 29th on the money list. His best finish in a major championship was T6 at the 1992 Masters Tournament. Schulz lost his Tour card in 1994. After that he played mostly in Nationwide Tour events, where his best finish is a T-13 at the 1995 NIKE Central Georgia Open.

Schulz became eligible to compete on the Champions Tour at the start of the 2010 season, and scored his first victory on the senior circuit at the Home Care & Hospice First Tee Open at Pebble Beach in September of that year.

Schulz volunteers as an assistant golf coach at his alma mater. He is a member of the University of Louisville Athletic Hall of Fame. Schulz and his wife Diane have three children.

Amateur  wins
1983 Kentucky State Amateur

Professional wins (7)

PGA Tour wins (2)

PGA Tour playoff record (0–1)

Other wins (4)
1984 Kentucky Open
1988 Kentucky Open
1989 Chrysler Team Championship (with David Ogrin), Jerry Ford Invitational (tie with Donnie Hammond)

Champions Tour wins (1)

Results in major championships

Note: Schulz never played in The Open Championship.

CUT = missed the half-way cut
"T" = tied

See also
1986 PGA Tour Qualifying School graduates
1988 PGA Tour Qualifying School graduates

References

External links

American male golfers
Louisville Cardinals men's golfers
PGA Tour golfers
PGA Tour Champions golfers
Golfers from Kentucky
Sportspeople from Louisville, Kentucky
1959 births
Living people